KatJonBand was a collaborative musical project between Jon Langford (guitarist for British band the Mekons) and Kat Ex (Katherina Bornefeld, drummer for Dutch band the Ex). After collaborating on and off for decades, Langford and Ex decided to write and record songs together in 2004 after Langford performed at one of the Ex's live shows in Amsterdam. They debuted the project in 2005, touring Germany and Austria, before recording 10 songs together and releasing them as KatJonBand's eponymous debut album in 2008.

KatJonBand (2008)

KatJonBand released their only album, also called KatJonBand, on September 23, 2008, on Carrot Top Records. 

Do You? 
Albion 
Limbo 
Machine Gun & The Ugly Doll 
Conquered 
Bad Apples 
Crackheads Beware 
Moonscape 
Hey You Don't Love Me 
Red Flag

References

Musical groups from Amsterdam
Musical groups established in 2004
Carrot Top Records artists
Musical groups disestablished in 2008
2004 establishments in the Netherlands
Dutch alternative rock groups